Bodianus speciosus, the blackbar hogfish, is a species of wrasse. 
It is found in the Eastern Central Atlantic Ocean.

Size

References

speciosus
Fish of the Pacific Ocean

Taxa named by Sarah Bowdich Lee
Fish described in 1825